Calopadia is a genus of foliicolous (leaf-dwelling) lichens in the family Pilocarpaceae. It was circumscribed by Czech lichenologist Antonín Vězda in 1986.

Species
Calopadia aurantiaca 
Calopadia bonitensis 
Calopadia cinereopruinosa 
Calopadia editiae 
Calopadia erythrocephala 
Calopadia floridana 
Calopadia foliicola 
Calopadia fusca 
Calopadia granulosa 
Calopadia imshaugii 
Calopadia lucida 
Calopadia nymanii 
Calopadia perpallida 
Calopadia phyllogena 
Calopadia puiggarii 
Calopadia saxicola 
Calopadia schaeferi 
Calopadia schomerae 
Calopadia subcoerulescens 
Calopadia subfusca 
Calopadia turbinata

References

Pilocarpaceae
Lichen genera
Lecanorales genera
Taxa named by Antonín Vězda